The 2010 World University Baseball Championship was an under-23 college baseball competition held at Meiji Jingu Stadium in Shinjuku, Yokohama Stadium in Naka-ku, Yokohama, Utsumi-Shimaoka Ballpark in Fuchū and KAIT Stadium in Atsugi, Japan from July 30 to August 7, 2010.

Teams
The following 8 nations were represented at the tournament.

First round

Group A

Standings

Schedule

Group B

Standings

Schedule

Finals

Quarterfinals

Ranking deciders

Semifinals

7th place match

5th place match

Bronze medal match

Gold medal match

Final standings

See also
2010 World University Boxing Championship
2010 World University Rugby Sevens Championship

References

External links

Official Website
Schedule and results

World University Championship
International baseball competitions hosted by Japan
2010 in Japanese sport
Baseball
World University Baseball Championship
July 2010 sports events in Japan
August 2010 sports events in Japan